Saunja is a small village in Sheosagar block of Rohtas district, in southern Bihar, India.

The prefix "Prabhu dham" was given by the saint SRI SRI 1008 SRI Tridandi Swami JI MAHARAJ for the devotion and affection of the people of this village in Lord Vishnu.

The Tulsi Vivah Mahotsav, a ceremonial marriage of Goddess Tulsi and Lord Shaligram, is celebrated here every year in the month of Kartik. Thousands of people gather here to participate in this celebration in which the devotees celebrate the marriage ceremony of Lord Vishnu and Mata Tulsi(Devi Brinda).

Demographics

Saunja is a medium size village located in Sheosagar of Rohtas district, Bihar, with total 93 families residing. The Saunja village has population of 592 of which 285 are males while 307 are females as per Population Census 2011.

In Saunja village population of children with age 0-6 is 89 which makes up 15.03% of total population of village. Average Sex Ratio of Saunja village is 1077 which is higher than Bihar state average of 918. Child Sex Ratio for the Saunja as per census is 679, lower than Bihar average of 935.

Saunja village has higher literacy rate compared to Bihar. In 2011, literacy rate of Saunja village was 69.58% compared to 61.80% of Bihar. In Saunja Male literacy stands at 78.02% while female literacy rate was 62.36%.

As per constitution of India and Panchyati Raaj Act, Saunja village is administrated by Sarpanch (Head of Village) who is elected representative of village.

Religious festival

In Prabhu Dham Saunja, India, Tulsi Vivah is collectively celebrated by whole village which makes it a significant point of attraction. Here it is celebrated as three day festival in the Hindi month of Kartik from Ekadashi to Trayodashi. The festival is started with the vedic chanting of Ramacharitra Manas or Ramayana by the villagers itself. The second day is celebrated as Sobha Yatra which is of significant importance in which the special prasad is Pongal, and the third day is celebrated as Tilakotsav and Vivahotsav of Lord Vishnu and Devi Brinda. The villagers prepare 56 types of prasad known as Chapan Bhog and distributed to all. All caste takes participation in this village accordingly. Devotees including saints and mahants all over from Bihar visit this place to celebrate this festive occasion.

References

Villages in Rohtas district